Santa Bárbara Airlines C.A, doing business as SBA Airlines and formerly as Santa Bárbara Airlines prior to 2008, was an airline with its headquarters on the third floor of the Edificio Tokay in Caracas, Venezuela. It operated scheduled domestic and international services. Its main base was Simón Bolívar International Airport, Maiquetía (Caracas).

History
The airline was established on 1 November 1995 and started operations on 1 March 1997. At March 2000, the airline had 80 employees and a fleet of three ATR 42-300s to serve both a domestic and a regional network that consisted of Aruba, Barquisimeto, Barranquilla, Caracas, Coro, Curaçao, Las Piedras, Maracaibo, Mérida, Santa Barbara Zulia and Valencia. It wholly owned Islas Airways until September 2006, when Islas was sold to the Canary Islands company Grupo SOAC. Santa Bárbara Airlines was rechristened as SBA Airlines in 2008, following the acquisition of the carrier by Aserca Airlines.

At first it only covered airline flights to Cabimas, Mérida, El Vigía and Santa Bárbara del Zulia. The route to Alberto Carnevali Airport in Mérida was diverted to El Vigía-Juan Pablo Pérez Alfonzo International Airport after the crash of Flight 518. Later, the airline took new destinations which covered the routes to Barquisimeto, Caracas, Cumaná, Las Piedras (Punto Fijo), San Antonio del Táchira and Valencia with a single overseas flight that covered the route Caracas – Oranjestad (Aruba).

In early 2009, a 245-seater Boeing 767-300ER was introduced into the fleet to replace a wet-leased aircraft of the same type, and Funchal and Madrid were incorporated into the international network (which already included Miami, Quito and Tenerife) in June the same year.

Later, the airline opened international routes from Caracas to Barranquilla, Quito, Lima, Lisboa, London, Madrid, Miami, New York, Santiago de Compostela, Orlando, Tenerife and Paris. The routes to New York City and Lima in the Americas, and Funchal, Lisboa, Madrid, Tenerife and Santiago de Compostela in Europe meanwhile ceased.

In late January 2018, the National Institute of Civil Aviation suspended SBA Airlines for 90 days citing the airline's impossibility to fulfil the schedules, amid the cancellation of some flights that left stranded passengers in Miami. At this time, the Caracas–Miami route was the only service the airline had available to book at its website.

Destinations
SBA Airlines served the following scheduled destinations as of January 2018. After all flights were suspended by government authorities on 26 January 2018,

Fleet

Final fleet
As of May 2017, the SBA Airlines fleet consisted of the following aircraft:

Previous fleet
Over the years, SBA Airlines had operated the following aircraft types:

Accidents and incidents
 
On 21 February 2008, an ATR 42-300 turboprop airliner operating Flight 518 from Mérida to Caracas, went missing shortly after taking off. Forty-three passengers and a crew of three, including two pilots and one flight attendant, were reportedly on board at the time. No survivors were found. After the accident, the company started a new public relations program as well as a new marketing initiative, switching the airline's name to SBA Airlines.

See also
PAWA Dominicana

References

External links

Official website

Defunct airlines of Venezuela
Latin American and Caribbean Air Transport Association
Airlines established in 1995
Airlines disestablished in 2018
2018 disestablishments in Venezuela
Venezuelan companies established in 1995